Prinzessin Maleen is a German-language television movie based on the German fairy-tale Maid Maleen by the Brothers Grimm. The film aired in 2015 as part of the series Sechs auf einen Streich.

Plot 
Princess Maleen and her childhood friend, Landgrave Konrad, have fallen in love. They ask for her father, Prince Theodor's permission to marry. Her father refuses, and insists that she marry one of his sinister courtiers, Baron Raimund. Princess Maleen refuses and, as punishment, is locked up in a tower for seven years. She frees herself after seven years to find that her father has died and his principality is in ruin. She travels to the county ruled by Konrad. Konrad, who believed Princess Maleen had died, is betrothed to marry Walpurga of Schwarztal. Walpurga, who only wants to marry Konrad to ensure that her inheritance does not go to her brother, plans to poison Konrad after the wedding. Maleen, searching for a new life, unknowingly begins working as a maid in Konrad's household. Walpurga, captivated by her social grace and beauty, bribes her into standing in for her at the wedding, but wearing a veil so that Konrad does not know it is not Walpurga. The plot fails and Walpurga is sent away. Konrad and Maleen are reunited.

Cast 
 Cleo von Adelsheim as Princess Maleen
 Peter Foyse as Landgrave Konrad
 Günther Maria Halmer as Prince Theodor
 Götz Otto as Baron Raimund
 Mariella Ahrens as Walpurga von Schwarztal
 Thorsten Nindel as Lothar
 Lucas Reiber as Peter
 Paula Paul as Maid Uta
 Peter Mitterrutzner as the old monk

Production 
Princess Maleen was directed by Matthias Steurer and produced by Marcus Roth and Sven Burgemeister. The film was shot in South Tyrol at Schloss Lebenberg, Ansitz Moos-Schulthaus, Schloss Englar, and Castelfeder Hill. It aired on German television on 26 December 2015.

References

External links 
 

2015 television films
2015 films
Films shot in Austria
German children's films
German romantic drama films
German television films
2010s German-language films
2010s German films
Das Erste original programming